Allerød Kommune is a municipality (Danish, kommune) on the island of Zealand (Sjælland) in eastern Denmark. The municipality covers an area of 67 km2, and has a population of 25,867 (1 January 2022).  Its mayor is Karsten Längerich of the political party
Venstre.

Overview
The main town, Lillerød (often referred to as 'Allerød'), is also the site of the municipal council. Smaller towns inside the municipality are Blovstrød and the towns of Lynge and Uggeløse, which have grown together

Allerød municipality was not merged with other municipalities on 1 January 2007 as part of nationwide Kommunalreformen ("The Municipality Reform" of 2007).

The warm period after the last ice age (Wisconsin glaciation) is named the Allerød Oscillation after an archaeological site found at Allerød.

In 1797 six Bronze Age lurs was found in Lynge at Brudevælte.

Allerød is part of the Green Cities concept 

The zip/postal code for Lillerød is 3450.

Economy
Allerød has a large concentration of technology companies in its industrial zones at the outskirts of the town. These include the hearing aid company Widex, Welltec, a developer of robotic technology for the off-shore industry and Weibel Scientific, a designer and manufacturer of continuous wave doppler radars. IBM has a large facility in Blovstrød, just outside Allerød, Widex in Vassingerød.

Other companies headquartered in Allerød are the engineering consultancy NIRAS, drug store and cosmetics chain MATAS, the development company Sjælsø Gruppen and the furniture companies Fritz Hansen and PP-Møbler.

Culture
Mungo Park is a small but very influential theatre, in the town centre.

Sports
The local badminton club, Lillerød BK, has won the Danish Badminton League four times and Europe League three times.

Politics

Municipal council
Allerød's municipal council consists of 21 members, elected every four years.

Below are the municipal councils elected since the Municipal Reform of 2007.

Locations

See also 
 Allerød station
 Mungo Park (theatre)

References 

 Municipal statistics: NetBorger Kommunefakta, delivered from KMD aka Kommunedata (Municipal Data)
 Municipal mergers and neighbors: Eniro new municipalities map

External links 

Municipality's official website
The Brudevaelte lurs.

 
Municipalities in the Capital Region of Denmark
Municipalities of Denmark